Grace Chinonyelum Anigbata (born 16 September 1998) is a Nigerian track and field athlete who specialises in the triple jump. She competed at the 2019 African Games in the triple jump winning a gold medal. In 2016, Grace Anigbata became Nigeria's high jump champion at age 18, with a jump of 1.70 m.

In 2018, she won the triple-jump event of the African championships in Asaba.

References

External links

Living people
1998 births
Nigerian female long jumpers
Nigerian female sprinters
Nigerian female triple jumpers
Nigerian female high jumpers
Athletes (track and field) at the 2019 African Games
African Games gold medalists for Nigeria
African Games medalists in athletics (track and field)
African Championships in Athletics winners
African Games gold medalists in athletics (track and field)
21st-century Nigerian women